Chillagoe was an electoral district of the Legislative Assembly in the Australian state of Queensland from 1912 to 1932.

The district was based on the Atherton Tablelands, based on the former Electoral district of Woothakata. Chillagoe was replaced by Electoral district of The Tableland at the 1932 elections.

Members for Chillagoe
The members for Chillagoe were:

Election results

See also
 Electoral districts of Queensland
 Members of the Queensland Legislative Assembly by year
 :Category:Members of the Queensland Legislative Assembly by name

References

Former electoral districts of Queensland
1912 establishments in Australia
1932 disestablishments in Australia
Constituencies established in 1912
Constituencies disestablished in 1932